Anthia sexguttata, the six-spot ground beetle, is a beetle of the Family Carabidae.

Appearance

Adults measure approximately 4 cm (1.5 inches), are black with six relatively large, white, dorsal spots (four over the elytra and two on the thorax). Other patterns are possible although the pattern is always symmetrical.

The larva has a flattened form, a large head capsule, and prominent mandibles.

Distribution
The species occurs in the drier parts of South Asia. It is common in the scrub forests of southern India.

Diet
Adult A. sexguttata feed on other insects and snails.

References

External links

 https://web.archive.org/web/20100915180828/http://www.carabidae.ru/Carabidae/sexguttata_fabricius_1775.html

Anthiinae (beetle)
Beetles of Asia
Beetles described in 1775
Taxa named by Johan Christian Fabricius